Jozef Urblík (born 22 August 1996) is a Slovak football midfielder who plays for the Nemzeti Bajnokság I club Vasas. His father Jozef Urblík was also footballer.

Career

Nitra
He made his Slovak Super Liga debut for Nitra against Dukla Banská Bystrica on 23 November 2013, entering in as a substitute in place of René Kotrík.

Vasas
On 21 February 2023, Urblík signed a two-and-a-half-year contract with Vasas.

Club statistics

External links
FC Vysočina Jihlava official club profile
FC Nitra profile

References

1996 births
People from Bardejov
Sportspeople from the Prešov Region
Living people
Slovak footballers
Slovakia youth international footballers
Slovakia under-21 international footballers
Association football midfielders
FC Nitra players
FC Vysočina Jihlava players
Puskás Akadémia FC players
Vasas SC players
Slovak Super Liga players
Czech First League players
Nemzeti Bajnokság I players
Slovak expatriate footballers
Expatriate footballers in the Czech Republic
Slovak expatriate sportspeople in the Czech Republic
Expatriate footballers in Hungary
Slovak expatriate sportspeople in Hungary